Dallin Watene-Zelezniak (born 17 August 1995) is a New Zealand professional rugby league footballer who plays as a er or  for the New Zealand Warriors in the NRL and New Zealand at international level.

He previously played for the Penrith Panthers and the Canterbury-Bankstown Bulldogs in the National Rugby League.

Background
Watene-Zelezniak was born in Hamilton, New Zealand, and is of Māori, Tongan and Polish descent and is from the Waikato Tainui Iwi. Watene-Zelezniak lived in Ngāruawāhia, before moving to Sydney, New South Wales, Australia as a 5-year old.

He played his junior rugby league for the St Clair Comets, before being signed by the Penrith Panthers. He attended St.Dominic’s College, Penrith and Patrician Brothers' College, Blacktown.

Watene-Zelezniak is the great-grandson of former New Zealand rugby league captain and politician, Steve Watene. Watene-Zelezniak is a member of the Church of Jesus Christ of Latter-day Saints (LDS Church). Dallin is the younger brother of former Penrith Panthers and Wests Tigers winger Malakai Watene-Zelezniak.

Playing career
In April 2013, Watene-Zelezniak re-signed with the Panthers on a 2-year contract. On 26 June 2013, in the curtain raiser to Game 2 of the 2013 State of Origin series, Watene-Zelenziak played for New South Wales under 18’s against Queensland under 18’s at Suncorp Stadium, scoring a hattrick of tries in the 56-6 smashing win. On 6 October 2013, Watene-Zelezniak played in the Panthers 2013 Holden Cup Grand Final against the New Zealand Warriors, playing on the wing in the 42–30 victory. Watene-Zelezniak was also selected to play for both the Australian Schoolboys team and Junior Kiwis team. He eventually chose to play for the Junior Kiwis. On 13 October 2013, Watene-Zelezniak played for the Junior Kiwis against the Junior Kangaroos, playing on the wing and scoring 2 tries in the 38–26 loss at WIN Stadium.

2014
In 2014 Watene-Zelezniak moved on to play in the Panthers NSW Cup team, before being included in the Panthers first grade squad. In Round 5 of the 2014 NRL season, Watene-Zelezniak made his NRL debut for the Penrith Panthers against the Canberra Raiders, scoring 2 tries on debut in the Panthers 12–6 win at Penrith Stadium. While playing in the Panthers NSW Cup side, Watene-Zelezniak was hit with a 4-match suspension after he performed an eye gouge on a Wyong Roos player during their 32–24 win. Watene-Zelezniak finished his debut year in the NRL with him playing in 10 matches and scoring 7 tries for the Panthers in the 2014 NRL season. On 7 October 2014, Watene-Zelezniak's impressive late season form saw him included in the New Zealand national rugby league team 24-man squad for the 2014 Four Nations. However he was later ruled out after he suffered a foot injury at training.

2015
On 5 February 2015, Watene-Zelezniak extended his contract with the Panthers until the end of 2016. On 28 April 2015, Watene-Zelezniak was ruled out of making his international debut for New Zealand in the 2015 Anzac Test after he was charged with a dangerous throw on Cronulla-Sutherland Sharks player Wade Graham. The suspension denied Watene-Zelezniak his New Zealand debut for the second time in 6-months. In Round 18, against the Sydney Roosters, Watene-Zelezniak suffered a collapsed lung during the Panthers 24–4 loss at Penrith Stadium and was ruled out for the rest of the season. Watene-Zelezniak finished off the 2015 NRL season with him playing in 16 matches and scoring 7 tries for the Panthers. On 10 November 2015, Watene-Zelezniak extended his contract with the Panthers until the end of 2017.

2016
In February, Watene-Zelezniak was named in the Panthers' 2016 NRL Auckland Nines squad. On 6 May 2016, Watene-Zelezniak made his international debut for New Zealand against Australia in the 2016 Anzac Test, playing on the wing in the 16–0 loss at Hunter Stadium. Watene-Zelezniak finished the 2016 NRL season with him playing in all of the Panthers 26 matches and scoring 12 tries. 

At the end of season, Watene-Zelezniak was selected in the New Zealand 24-man squad for the 2016 Four Nations. Watene-Zelezniak played in one match in the tournament, playing at fullback in the Kiwis 18-all draw against Scotland at Derwent Park.

2017
On 3 April 2017, Watene-Zelezniak extended his contract with the Panthers to the end of the 2020 season. On 5 May 2017, Watene-Zelezniak played for New Zealand against Australia in the 2017 Anzac Test, playing on the wing in the 30–12 loss at Canberra Stadium. On 22 July 2017, Watene-Zelezniak was involved in an ugly incident at a junior rugby league match. The Kiwi international who was volunteering as a touch judge between his junior club the St Clair Comets and the St Mary Saints was abused by an official from St Mary's after he put his flag up to signify a St Mary’s player had stepped into touch, the altercation would become physical, with the official putting his hands around the Panthers star’s neck and wrestling with him. "It was very ugly and parents and officials had to take the kids across the field before a few people eventually broke it up," an eyewitness explained. The official was later copped with a lifetime banned from Junior Rugby League. Watene-Zelezniak finished the 2017 NRL season with him playing in 24 matches and scoring 9 tries for the Panthers. On 5 October 2017, Watene-Zelezniak was named in the 24-man New Zealand Kiwis squad for the 2017 Rugby League World Cup. On 11 November 2017, in the Kiwis entertaining clash against Tonga, Watene-Zelezniak scored his first try for the Kiwis in the shock 28–22 loss at Waikato Stadium. Watene-Zelezniak played in 3 matches and scored 1 try for the Kiwis in their disappointing World Cup campaign.

2019
On 9 June 2019, Watene-Zelezniak was released from his contract with the Penrith Panthers effective immediately to sign with the Canterbury-Bankstown Bulldogs.

Watene-Zelezniak made a total of 10 appearances for Canterbury in his first year at the club.  During the mid-way part of the season, Canterbury found themselves sitting last on the table and in real danger of finishing with the wooden spoon.  However, for the third straight season, Canterbury achieved four upset victories in a row over Penrith, the Wests Tigers, South Sydney and Parramatta who were all competing for a place in the finals series and were higher on the table.  Canterbury ended the season in 12th place.

2020
In round 12 of the 2020 NRL season against arch rivals Parramatta, Watene-Zelezniak played the ball in the opposite direction giving a penalty to Parramatta in which they scored off the next play.  Canterbury would go on to lose the match 18-16 at ANZ Stadium leaving them on the bottom of the table.

He made a total of 18 appearances for Canterbury in the 2020 NRL season.  The club finished in 15th place on the table, only avoiding the Wooden Spoon by for and against.

2021
In round 1 of the 2021 NRL season, he scored two tries for Canterbury in a 32-16 loss against Newcastle.

On 20 June, Watene-Zelezniak played his final game for Canterbury in round 15 against Parramatta which ended in a 36-10 defeat.

He then signed a three-and-a-half year deal to join the New Zealand Warriors effective immediately.

On 2 July, Watene-Zelezniak played his first game for the New Zealand Warriors in a one point loss to St. George Illawarra.

2022
He made a total of 19 appearances for the New Zealand Warriors in the 2022 NRL season as they finished 15th on the table.

In October he was named in the New Zealand squad for the 2021 Rugby League World Cup. In the second group stage match at the 2021 Rugby League World Cup, Watene-Zelezniak scored four tries in New Zealand's 68-6 victory over Jamaica.

Personal life
Dallin Watene-Zelezniak with his brother started a watch Company W Zelezniak.
Dallin Watene-Zelezniak is the younger brother of former NRL player Malakai Watene-Zelezniak

References

External links

Canterbury Bulldogs profile
Penrith Panthers profile
Panthers profile
NRL profile
2017 RLWC profile

1995 births
Living people
Australian company founders
Canterbury-Bankstown Bulldogs players
Junior Kiwis players
New Zealand emigrants to Australia
New Zealand expatriate sportspeople in Australia
New Zealand Māori rugby league players
New Zealand national rugby league team captains
New Zealand national rugby league team players
New Zealand people of Polish descent
New Zealand sportspeople of Tongan descent
New Zealand rugby league players
New Zealand Warriors players
Penrith Panthers players
People from Ngāruawāhia
Rugby league centres
Rugby league fullbacks
Rugby league players from Hamilton, New Zealand
Rugby league wingers